The voiceless linguolabial plosive is a rare consonantal sound used in some spoken languages.

Features 

Features:

Occurrence

References

Further reading

External links
 

Linguolabial consonants
Pulmonic consonants
Voiceless oral consonants
Voiceless stops